Una is an unincorporated community in Clay County, Mississippi, United States.

The Una Post Office operated from 1890 to 1906. The Una School District once operated a school in Una.

The Lawson Chapel is located in Una.  Fire protection is offered by the Clay County Volunteer Fire Department Unit 400.

References

Unincorporated communities in Clay County, Mississippi
Unincorporated communities in Mississippi